Skåpafors is a locality situated in Bengtsfors Municipality, Västra Götaland County, Sweden. It had 313 inhabitants in 2010.

References 

Populated places in Västra Götaland County
Populated places in Bengtsfors Municipality
Dalsland